The 1975 Ball State Cardinals football team was an American football team that represented Ball State University in the Mid-American Conference (MAC) during the 1975 NCAA Division I football season. In its fifth season under head coach Dave McClain, the team compiled a 9–2 record (4–2 against MAC opponents) and finished third in the conference. 

The team's statistical leaders included Art Yaroch with 720 passing yards, Earl Taylor with 901 rushing yards and 48 points scored, and Mike Andress with 480 receiving yards.

Schedule

References

Ball State
Ball State Cardinals football seasons
Ball State Cardinals football